Aranka Hennyei (15 July 1900 – 1987) was a Hungarian gymnast. She competed in the women's artistic team all-around event at the 1928 Summer Olympics.

References

External links
 

1900 births
1987 deaths
Hungarian female artistic gymnasts
Olympic gymnasts of Hungary
Gymnasts at the 1928 Summer Olympics
Place of birth missing